Provincial Trunk Highway 21 (PTH 21) is a provincial highway in the Canadian province of Manitoba. It runs from the U.S. border (where it meets with ND 14) to PTH 45 and PR 577 in the village of Oakburn.

PTH 21 is two lanes and runs north–south in the southwestern region of the province. It is the main highway for the towns of Deloraine (where it meets PTH 3), Hartney, Hamiota, and Shoal Lake.

The speed limit is 90 km/h (55 mph).

In 2012, PTH 21 was given the dubious distinction of being named the second-worst road in the province that year.

History
The northern terminus for PTH 21 was originally located at PTH 2 in Deleau. In 1947, it extended north to PTH 1 in Griswold. In 1949,
it extended north to PTH 4 in Shoal Lake, replacing part of PTH 1 and all of PTH 28. In 1960, PTH 21 extended north to its present terminus.

Major intersections

References

External links 
Manitoba Official Map - Southwest
Manitoba Official Map - Western Manitoba

021